Taratava is a village in West Godavari district in the state of Andhra Pradesh in India.

Demographics
 India census, Taratava has a population of 640 of which 339 are males while 301 are females. The average sex ratio of Taratava village is 888. The child population is 68, which makes up 10.63% of the total population of the village, with sex ratio 581, significantly lower than state average. In 2011, the literacy rate of Taratava village was 72.38% when compared to 67.02% of Andhra Pradesh.

See also 
 West Godavari district

References 

Villages in West Godavari district